Below is the list of populated places in Kars Province, Turkey by the districts. In the following lists first place in each list is the administrative center of the district.

Kars
Kars
Ağadeve, Kars
Akbaba, Kars
Akdere, Kars
Alaca, Kars
Alçılı, Kars
Arazoğlu, Kars
Arslanizi, Kars
Ataköy, Kars
Atayurt, Kars
Ayakgedikler, Kars
Aydınalan, Kars
Azat, Kars
Başgedikler, Kars
Başkaya, Kars
Bayraktar, Kars
Bekler, Kars
Boğatepe, Kars
Boğaz, Kars
Borluk, Kars
Bozkale, Kars
Bulanık, Kars
Büyükaküzüm, Kars
Çağlayan, Kars
Çakmak, Kars
Çamurlu, Kars
Çerme, Kars
Çığırgan, Kars
Çorak, Kars
Davul, Kars
Derecik, Kars
Dikme, Kars
Esenkent, Kars
Esenyazı, Kars
Eşmeyazı, Kars
Gelirli, Kars
Güdeli, Kars
Hacıhalil, Kars
Hacıveli, Kars
Halefoğlu, Kars
Hamzagerek, Kars
Hapanlı, Kars
Hasçiftlik, Kars
Karacaören, Kars
Karaçoban, Kars
Karakale, Kars
Karakaş, Kars
Kocabahçe, Kars
Kozluca, Kars
Küçükboğatepe, Kars
Küçükpirveli, Kars
Küçükyusuf, Kars
Külveren, Kars
Kümbetli, Kars
Maksutçuk, Kars
Mezraa, Kars
Ocaklı, Kars
Oğuzlu, Kars
Ortagedikler, Kars
Ölçülü, Kars
Soylu, Kars
Söğütlü, Kars
Subatan, Kars
Tazekent, Kars
Tekneli, Kars
Üçbölük, Kars
Verimli, Kars
Yağıkesen, Kars
Yalçınlar, Kars
Yalınkaya, Kars
Yılanlı, Kars
Yolaçan, Kars
Yücelen, Kars

Akyaka
 Akyaka
 Akbulak, Akyaka
 Aslahane, Akyaka
 Boyuntaş, Akyaka
 Büyükdurduran, Akyaka
 Büyükpirveli, Akyaka
 Cebeci, Akyaka
 Camuşlu, Akyaka
 Çetindurak, Akyaka
 Demirkent, Akyaka
 Duraklı, Akyaka
 Esenyayla, Akyaka
 Geçitköy, Akyaka
 Hacıpiri, Akyaka
 İbişköy, Akyaka
 İncedere, Akyaka
 Kalkankale, Akyaka
 Kayadöven, Akyaka
 Karahan, Akyaka
 Kayaköprü, Akyaka
 Küçükaküzüm, Akyaka
 Küçükdurduran, Akyaka
 Kürekdere, Akyaka
 Sulakbahçe, Akyaka
 Süngüderesi, Akyaka
 Şahnalar, Akyaka
 Üçpınar, Akyaka

Arpaçay
 Arpaçay
 Akçakale, Arpaçay
 Akçalar, Arpaçay
 Akmazdam, Arpaçay
 Arslanoğlu, Arpaçay
 Atcılar, Arpaçay
 Aydıngün, Arpaçay
 Bacıoğlu, Arpaçay
 Bardaklı, Arpaçay
 Bozyiğit, Arpaçay
 Burcalı, Arpaçay
 Büyükçatma, Arpaçay
 Carcı, Arpaçay
 Carcıoğlu, Arpaçay
 Çanaksu, Arpaçay
 Dağköyü, Arpaçay
 Değirmenköprü, Arpaçay
 Doğruyol, Arpaçay
 Gediksatılmış, Arpaçay
 Göldalı, Arpaçay
 Gönülalan, Arpaçay
 Gülyüzü, Arpaçay
 Güvercin, Arpaçay
 Hasançavuş, Arpaçay
 Kakaç, Arpaçay
 Karakale, Arpaçay
 Karaurgan, Arpaçay
 Kardeştepe, Arpaçay
 Kıraç, Arpaçay
 Koçköyü, Arpaçay
 Kuyucuk, Arpaçay
 Kuzgunlu, Arpaçay
 Küçükboğaz, Arpaçay
 Küçükçatma, Arpaçay
 Kümbet, Arpaçay
 Melikköyü, Arpaçay
 Mescitli, Arpaçay
 Meydancık, Arpaçay
 Okçuoğlu, Arpaçay
 Polatköyü, Arpaçay
 Söğütlü, Arpaçay
 Taşbaşı, Arpaçay
 Taşdere, Arpaçay
 Taşköprü, Arpaçay
 Taşlıağıl, Arpaçay
 Telek, Arpaçay
 Tepecik, Arpaçay
 Tepeköy, Arpaçay
 Tomarlı, Arpaçay

Digor
 Digor
 Alem, Digor
 Arpalı, Digor
 Aşağıbaşköy, Digor
 Bacalı, Digor
 Başköy, Digor
 Bayırbağı, Digor
 Bostankale, Digor
 Celalköy, Digor
 Çatak, Digor
 Dağpınar, Digor
 Derinöz, Digor
 Dolaylı, Digor
 Düzgeçit, Digor
 Eren, Digor
 Gülhayran, Digor
 Halıkışlak, Digor
 Hasancan, Digor
 Hisarönü, Digor
 Karabağ, Digor
 Karakale, Digor
 Kilittaşı, Digor
 Kocaköy, Digor
 Köseler, Digor
 Mahirbey, Digor
 Oyuklu, Digor
 Saklıca, Digor
 Sorguçkavak, Digor
 Sorkunlu, Digor
 Şatıroğlu, Digor
 Şenol, Digor
 Şirinköy, Digor
 Türkmeşen, Digor
 Uzunkaya, Digor
 Varlı, Digor
 Yağlıca, Digor
 Yaylacık, Digor
 Yemençayır, Digor
 Yeniköy, Digor

Kağızman
 Kağızman
 Ağdam, Kağızman
 Akçakale, Kağızman
 Akçay, Kağızman
 Akören, Kağızman
 Akyayla, Kağızman
 Altungedik, Kağızman
 Aşağıkaragüney, Kağızman
 Aşağıtut, Kağızman
 Aydınkavak, Kağızman
 Bulanık, Kağızman
 Bücüklü, Kağızman
 Camuşlu, Kağızman
 Çallı, Kağızman
 Çayarası, Kağızman
 Çaybük, Kağızman
 Çengilli, Kağızman
 Çeperli, Kağızman
 Çiçekli, Kağızman
 Çilehane, Kağızman
 Çukurayva, Kağızman
 Değirmendere, Kağızman
 Denizgölü, Kağızman
 Devebük, Kağızman
 Dibekkaya, Kağızman
 Donandı, Kağızman
 Duranlar, Kağızman
 Esenkır, Kağızman
 Evyapan, Kağızman
 Görecek, Kağızman
 Gümüştepe, Kağızman
 Günindi, Kağızman
 Günindiyaylası, Kağızman
 Güvendik, Kağızman
 Karabağ, Kağızman
 Karaboncuk, Kağızman
 Karacaören, Kağızman
 Karakale, Kağızman
 Karakuş, Kağızman
 Keşişkıran, Kağızman
 Kozlu, Kağızman
 Kökpınar, Kağızman
 Kömürlü, Kağızman
 Kötek, Kağızman
 Kuloğlu, Kağızman
 Kuruyayla, Kağızman
 Ortaköy, Kağızman
 Paslı, Kağızman
 Sağbaş, Kağızman
 Şaban, Kağızman
 Taşbilek, Kağızman
 Taşburun, Kağızman
 Tomruktaş, Kağızman
 Tunçkaya, Kağızman
 Ürker, Kağızman
 Yağlıca, Kağızman
 Yalnızağaç, Kağızman
 Yankıpınar, Kağızman
 Yellikıran, Kağızman
 Yenice, Kağızman
 Yolkorur, Kağızman
 Yukarıkaragüney, Kağızman

Sarıkamış
 Sarıkamış
 Akkoz, Sarıkamış
 Akören, Sarıkamış
 Alisofu, Sarıkamış
 Altınbulak, Sarıkamış
 Armutlu, Sarıkamış
 Asbuğa, Sarıkamış
 Aşağısallıpınar, Sarıkamış
 Balabantaş, Sarıkamış
 Balıklı, Sarıkamış
 Başköy, Sarıkamış
 Belencik, Sarıkamış
 Beşyol, Sarıkamış
 Boyalı, Sarıkamış
 Bozat, Sarıkamış
 Çamyazı, Sarıkamış
 Çardakçatı, Sarıkamış
 Çatak, Sarıkamış
 Çolaklı, Sarıkamış
 Eşmeçayır, Sarıkamış
 Gecikmez, Sarıkamış
 Güllüce, Sarıkamış
 Hamamlı, Sarıkamış
 Handere, Sarıkamış
 İnkaya, Sarıkamış
 İsisu, Sarıkamış
 Kalebaşı, Sarıkamış
 Karaköse, Sarıkamış
 Karakurt, Sarıkamış
 Karapınar, Sarıkamış
 Karaurgan, Sarıkamış
 Kayalıboğaz, Sarıkamış
 Kazantaş, Sarıkamış
 Kazıkkaya, Sarıkamış
 Koçoğlu, Sarıkamış
 Kozan, Sarıkamış
 Köroğlu, Sarıkamış
 Kurbançayır, Sarıkamış
 Mescitli, Sarıkamış
 Odalar, Sarıkamış
 Ortakale, Sarıkamış
 Parmakdere, Sarıkamış
 Sırataşlar, Sarıkamış
 Sırbasan, Sarıkamış
 Süngütaşı, Sarıkamış
 Şehitemin, Sarıkamış
 Şehithalit, Sarıkamış
 Taşlıgüney, Sarıkamış
 Topkaya, Sarıkamış
 Uzungazi, Sarıkamış
 Yağbasan, Sarıkamış
 Yarkaya, Sarıkamış
 Yayıklı, Sarıkamış
 Yenigazi, Sarıkamış
 Yeniköy, Sarıkamış
 Yukarısallıpınar, Sarıkamış

Selim
 Selim
 Aşağıdamlapınar, Selim
 Akçakale, Selim
 Akpınar, Selim
 Akyar, Selim
 Alisofu, Selim
 Aşağıkotanlı, Selim
 Başköy, Selim
 Bayburt, Selim
 Baykara, Selim
 Benliahmet, Selim
 Beyköy, Selim
 Bozkuş, Selim
 Bölükbaş, Selim
 Büyükdere, Selim
 Çaybaşı, Selim
 Çıplaklı, Selim
 Darboğaz, Selim
 Dölbentli, Selim
 Eskigazi, Selim
 Eskigeçit, Selim
 Gelinalan, Selim
 Gürbüzler, Selim
 Hasbey, Selim
 İğdir, Selim
 Kamışlı, Selim
 Karaçayır, Selim
 Karahamza, Selim
 Karakale, Selim
 Katranlı, Selim
 Kekeç, Selim
 Kırkpınar, Selim
 Koşapınar, Selim
 Koyunyurdu, Selim
 Laloğlu, Selim
 Mollamustafa, Selim
 Oluklu, Selim
 Oluklu (small), Selim
 Ortakale, Selim
 Sarıgün, Selim
 Söğütlü, Selim
 Tozluca, Selim
 Tuygun, Selim
 Yamaçlı, Selim
 Yalnızçam, Selim
 Yassıca, Selim
 Yaylacık, Selim
 Yenice, Selim
 Yeşiltepe, Selim
 Yolgeçmez, Selim
 Yukarıdamlapınar, Selim
 Yukarıkotanlı, Selim

Susuz
 Susuz
 Aksu, Susuz
 Aynalı, Susuz
 Büyükçatak, Susuz
 Çamçavuş, Susuz
 Çığrıklı, Susuz
 Doyumlu, Susuz
 Erdağı, Susuz
 Ermişler, Susuz
 Gölbaşı, Susuz
 Harmanlı, Susuz
 İncesu, Susuz
 İncilipınar, Susuz
 Kalecik, Susuz
 Karapınar, Susuz
 Kayadibi, Susuz
 Kayalık, Susuz
 Keçili, Susuz
 Kırçiçeği, Susuz
 Kırkpınar, Susuz
 Kiziroğlu, Susuz
 Kurugöl, Susuz
 Küçükçatak, Susuz
 Ortalar, Susuz
 Porsuklu, Susuz
 Taşlıca, Susuz
 Yaylacık, Susuz
 Yolboyu, Susuz

References

List
Kars